Łukasz Kubot (born 16 May 1982) is a Polish professional tennis player who is a former world No. 1 in doubles.

He is a two-time Grand Slam champion in doubles, having won the 2014 Australian Open with Robert Lindstedt, as well as the 2017 Wimbledon Championships with Marcelo Melo. Kubot has won 27 doubles titles on the ATP Tour, including four at Masters 1000 level, all alongside Melo. The pair also finished runners-up at the 2018 US Open and 2017 ATP Finals. In January 2018 he became world No. 1 for the first time, the first Polish player ever to do so in singles or doubles.

Kubot has also had success in singles, achieving a career-high ranking of world No. 41 in April 2010 and reaching the quarterfinals of the 2013 Wimbledon Championships. He also reached the final at the 2009 Serbia Open and the 2010 Brasil Open. Kubot has represented Poland in the Davis Cup since 2001, also competing at three editions of the Summer Olympics. In 2013 he was awarded the Gold Cross of Merit by Polish President Bronisław Komorowski.

Personal life
Łukasz Kubot was born in Bolesławiec, Poland. His parents are Dorota and Janusz Kubot, a football player and coach. He has a sister named Paulina Kubot-Wojtasińska. Kubot and his fiancé Magdalena Bieńkowska welcomed their daughter Zofia on September 9, 2020. He speaks five languages: Polish, Czech, German, English, and Russian.

Career

2007–2009: First doubles title
In 2007 Kubot's two main-draw wins came in Davis Cup ties. In 2008 Kubot did not play a single main-draw match.

Kubot started 2009 by competing in the qualifying rounds of Qatar ExxonMobil Open and the Australian Open, but he fell in the final round. He then qualified for the Brasil Open, where he recorded his first main-draw win in over one and a half year against Daniel Gimeno Traver, but lost in the following round to Thomaz Bellucci. He then continued to play in qualifying, but failed to qualify. However, in the 2009 Serbia Open, he fell in the final round of the qualifying draw, but was granted a lucky loser spot after Steve Darcis withdrew due a shoulder injury. He defeated Arsenije Zlatanović, Igor Andreev, Kristof Vliegen, and an upset victory over second seed Ivo Karlović. He then lost in straight sets against World No. 3 and top seed Novak Djokovic, in his first final. He became the first Pole to reach an ATP final in 26 years (since Wojciech Fibak in 1983). He also reached the doubles final at the same event partnering Oliver Marach, which he won.

At Roland Garros, he qualified, but lost to Viktor Troicki in the first round, in just around 4 hours. His next main-draw appearance came in MercedesCup in Stuttgart, where he recorded wins over Pablo Andújar and Philipp Kohlschreiber, but lost to Nicolas Kiefer in the quarterfinals. He then qualified in Cincinnati, but lost to José Acasuso, in the first round. In Beijing, he recorded the biggest win of his career by upsetting Andy Roddick in the very first round, but lost to Ivan Ljubičić the following round. He then lost in the first rounds of Shanghai and Vienna. In the 2009 BNP Paribas Masters, he defeated Andreas Beck, but lost to Marin Čilić, after qualifying.

In doubles, he won the 2009 Grand Prix Hassan II, the 2009 Serbia Open, and the 2009 Bank Austria-TennisTrophy, all with his regular doubles partner Oliver Marach. They also reached the semifinals of the 2009 Australian Open, losing to Mahesh Bhupathi and Mark Knowles. They were able to qualify in the 2009 ATP World Tour Finals, falling in the round-robin stage despite winning two matches over the teams of Max Mirnyi and Andy Ram, and Lukáš Dlouhý and Leander Paes, only losing to Bob Bryan and Mike Bryan

2010: Three doubles titles

Kubot started his 2010 campaign in Doha, where he reached the quarterfinals, losing to Viktor Troicki, after recording straight-set wins over Karim Maamoun and Sergiy Stakhovsky. He then played in the Australian Open, where he reached his first fourth round in a Grand Slam tournament. He earned this spot by defeating Mischa Zverev, and Santiago Giraldo, and through the withdrawal of 20th seed Mikhail Youzhny. He was defeated by Novak Djokovic. In the Movistar Open, he lost to Marcel Granollers, after defeating Horacio Zeballos. In the 2010 Brasil Open, he reached the final, his second of his career. He earned that by defeating Óscar Hernández, Albert Montañés, and Fabio Fognini, in straight sets. He came back against fourth seed Igor Andreev in the semifinals. In the final, he lost to top seed Juan Carlos Ferrero, failing to hold serve in the whole match.

He then suffered early losses in his next three tournaments to credible players in the 2010 Copa Telmex, losing to Juan Mónaco, in the 2010 Abierto Mexicano Telcel to Fernando Verdasco, and the 2010 BNP Paribas Open to David Nalbandian. He then regained form, reaching the quarterfinals of the 2010 Grand Prix Hassan II, losing to Potito Starace. However, he lost in the first round of the 2010 Monte-Carlo Rolex Masters to Viktor Troicki.

In doubles, he won the 2010 Movistar Open in Santiago, the Mexican Open (tennis) in Acapulco, and the Romanian Open Trophy in Bucharest.

2011: Fourth round at Wimbledon

At the 2011 French Open, Kubot was down two sets to none in his first-round match against 11th seed Nicolás Almagro. Kubot stormed back and won the match in five sets. He progressed to the third round, before he was ousted. He earned the nickname "Lukasz the Lionhearted" for his aggressive style of play.

He then qualified for the 2011 Wimbledon Championships and advanced to the fourth round, defeating Arnaud Clément in five sets, Ivo Karlović in straight sets, and Gaël Monfils in four sets. In the fourth round, he led Feliciano López by two sets to love and had two match points in the third set tiebreak, but eventually lost in five sets.

2012: Stuttgart Open doubles title
Kubot made the quarterfinals in Memphis, before losing to Benjamin Becker. He also made the quarterfinals in Bucharest, only to meet and lose to Gilles Simon.

He made the third round of the French Open, losing to Belgian David Goffin.

He made the quarterfinals in Gstaad, where he lost to Grigor Dimitrov. At Winston-Salem, he made the third round, only to lose again to Goffin.

In doubles, he made three finals, including the Masters 1000 event in Rome, partnering Janko Tipsarević. He won the tournament in Stuttgart, partnering Jérémy Chardy.

2013: Wimbledon quarterfinal

Ranked no. 130 in the world, Kubot reached the quarterfinals of 2013 Wimbledon Championships. He beat Igor Andreev in the first round before getting a walkover after second round opponent (and conqueror of Rafael Nadal in the first round) Steve Darcis withdrew through injury. He then beat Benoît Paire and Adrian Mannarino before losing in a historic all-Polish slam quarterfinal against Jerzy Janowicz.

2014: Australian Open doubles title

In January Kubot and Sweden's Robert Lindstedt won the Australian Open men's doubles title. The pair had played just two tennis tournaments together, losing in the first round of both, before entering the Australian Open. In the final they defeated American Eric Butorac and South African Raven Klaasen, who had knocked out top seeds Bob Bryan and Mike Bryan. Lindstedt said he had been slated to play with Jürgen Melzer, but the Austrian withdrew with injury before the tournament. "I had to scramble up a partner in December and I'm thankful that Kubot said yes", stated Lindstedt.

2016: Third Vienna Open doubles title and race to Rio

In August Kubot participated in the 2016 Summer Olympics in Rio de Janeiro, Brazil. Partnered with Marcin Matkowski, he defeated Indian tennis pair of Leander Paes and Rohan Bopanna. Subsequently, Kubot and Matkowski lost to the eighth seeded Spanish pair of Roberto Bautista Agut and David Ferrer in the second round.  Kubot also participated in the mixed doubles, where he was partnered with the 2015 WTA Finals winner, Agnieszka Radwańska. Radwańska and Kubot lost to the Romanian pair of Irina Camelia Begu and Horia Tecău in the first round. 

In October, Kubot partnered with Marcelo Melo defeated Oliver Marach and Fabrice Martin to win the Vienna Open Doubles Title for the third time in his career.

2017: Wimbledon doubles title and year-end No. 1 ATP doubles ranking

In March Kubot with his doubles partner Marcelo Melo reached the doubles final at Indian Wells Masters. Eighth-seeded Łukasz Kubot and Marcelo Melo reached the BNP Paribas Open semi-finals after breezing past tricky wild card duo, Nick Kyrgios and Nenad Zimonjić. The Polish-Brazilian pair then defeated fourth seeds Jamie Murray and Bruno Soares to reach the final against the 6th seeds, South Africa's Raven Klaasen and his American doubles partner, Rajeev Ram. At the 2017 Miami Open Kubot and Melo dropped only three sets en route to the final, defeating Marcus Daniell & Marcelo Demoliner, Jean-Julien Rojer & Horia Tecău, Jamie Murray & Bruno Soares in QF and Daniel Nestor & Brian Baker in SF to reach their second straight ATP Masters 1000 final. The sixth-seeded Kubot and Melo defeated American duo Nick Monroe and Jack Sock in straight sets. They made it all the way together at an ATP event for the first time this season. It was their first ever Masters 1000 title won as a team as well. Kubot and Melo have continued their streak of claiming at least one ATP doubles title together in a season for the third straight year. They're back-to-back Vienna doubles champions, having won the tournament together in 2015 and 2016. Miami Open was their 11th career tournament together, with a current overall 22–8 record and 12–6 record in 2017.

In April Kubot and Melo reached the quarter-finals at the Monte-Carlo Masters, the season's third Masters 1000 tournament. The following month they reached their third ATP World Tour Masters 1000 final of the season after they defeated seventh seeds Ivan Dodig and Marcel Granollers at the Mutua Madrid Open (tennis). In the Mutua Madrid Open final they defeated French duo consisting of Nicolas Mahut and Édouard Roger-Vasselin to win their second Masters 1000 doubles title this season. Seeded fourth at the French Open Kubot and Melo overcame a first round challenge from Julien Benneteau and Jérémy Chardy to advance to the second round. In the 2nd round they lost to Ryan Harrison and Michael Venus.

Kubot and Melo continued their outstanding season by taking the doubles title at the Ricoh Open, living up to their top seed status in 's-Hertogenbosch by defeating second seeds Raven Klaasen and Rajeev Ram. "We’ve had a really good year. It's another title for us, so we’re very happy with the way we’re playing", said Kubot. As top seeds Kubot and Melo continued their dominance on grass courts by taking the doubles title at the Gerry Weber Open in Halle, outlasting brothers Alexander Zverev and Mischa Zverev. Their victory in Halle also further extended their lead in the Emirates ATP Doubles Race To London. They stayed perfect on the grass courts, ousting top seeds Henri Kontinen and John Peers in the Wimbledon semi-finals. In the Wimbledon final, the fourth seeds defeated 16th seeds Oliver Marach and Mate Pavić. The final lasted a marathon 4 hours 41 minutes and was only the fourth Wimbledon men's doubles final to go to five sets in the last 20 years.

In November Kubot and Melo won the men's doubles title at the Paris Masters tennis tournament. The pair beat Ivan Dodig and Marcel Granollers in the final. The Polish-Brazilian duo made the final after easing past Jamie Murray and Bruno Soares in the semifinal and Feliciano López and Marc López in the quarterfinals. The Paris victory marks Kubot and Melo's sixth title of the season, after wins at Wimbledon, Miami, Madrid, Halle and s'Hertogenbosch. Following the Paris Masters Kubot officially moved up to world No. 2 in the Association of Tennis Professionals’ (ATP) doubles rankings.

At the Nitto ATP Finals top seeds Kubot and Melo outclassed No. 7 seeds Ivan Dodig and Marcel Granollers to clinch year-end No. 1 ATP doubles ranking. "This year has been amazing for me and Lukas, the first year we're playing together. Finishing as the No. 1 team in the world for me, it means a lot", Melo said, "We achieved this as a team. I'm very proud". They also defeated four-time former season finale champions Bob Bryan and Mike Bryan and subsequently qualified for the semi-finals. In the semifinal they knocked out eighth seed Ryan Harrison and Michael Venus for a place in the title match. In the final Kubot and Melo, who were 49-17 for the season, fell to second seeds and defending champions Henri Kontinen and John Peers.

2018: World No. 1 in doubles, tied with Marcelo Melo

At the start of the season top-seeds Łukasz Kubot and Marcelo Melo defeated Jan-Lennard Struff and Viktor Troicki to capture the Sydney International men's doubles title.

Following Sydney Kubot attained No. 1 in the ATP Doubles Rankings, and has become the 51st player since 1976 to reach the pinnacle of the sport. "It's great for Poland", said Kubot. "I’m happy that I’m one of the ambassadors for tennis in my country, putting Polish tennis on the map of the world. I’m grateful to Wojtek Fibak, who was No. 2 in doubles (1979) and Top 10 in singles (1977). He gave me a lot of advice from his experience, and motivation".

Top seeds Kubot and Melo advanced to the Australian Open quarter-finals after coming from a set down to beat 16th seeds Rajeev Ram and Divij Sharan. Unbeaten in 2018, they lost to Ben McLachlan and Jan-Lennard Struff in the quarterfinal.

In Halle, Marcelo Melo and Łukasz Kubot—who went undefeated on grass last year—defended their title, beating Alexander and Mischa Zverev in the final. It was Melo and Kubot's first title victory since January in Sydney. At Wimbledon, seeded second, Kubot and Melo lost to Jonathan Erlich and Marcin Matkowski in the second round.

Fifth seeds Kubot and Melo advanced to the quarter-finals of the Western & Southern Open for the second year in a row, beating Rogers Cup finalists Raven Klaasen and Michael Venus. The Polish-Brazilian duo avenged a loss they suffered against the same team one week ago in Toronto. In the quarterfinal Kubot and Melo lost to fourth seeds Jamie Murray and Bruno Soares, who triumphed in Acapulco and Washington, D.C. earlier this season. It was the first Head2Head meeting between the two teams this year.

Seeded seventh at the US Open, Kubot and Melo defeated Divij Sharan and Artem Sitak in the second round. In the third round they overpowered the 2018 French Open champions Nicolas Mahut and Pierre-Hugues Herbert. They continued their great form with a straight set win over Austin Krajicek and Tennys Sandgren to reach their first US Open semifinal. In the semifinal they defeated Malek Jaziri and Radu Albot for a spot in the final of the Men's doubles event at the 2018 US Open. Kubot and Melo came into the tournament having lost five of their previous seven matches and also ended up losing to the third-seeded Americans Mike Bryan and Jack Sock in the final.

No. 2 seeds Kubot and Melo beat top-seeded Oliver Marach and Mate Pavić in the China Open final to claim their third team title of the season. Following China Open they also won the Rolex Shanghai Masters doubles title. In the Shanghai final they defeated sixth-seeded Jamie Murray and Bruno Soares to continue their strong form and win back-to-back titles.

For the second consecutive season Kubot and Melo qualified for the Nitto ATP Finals at The O2 Arena in London. No. 3 seeds Kubot and Melo secured a spot for the prestigious season-ending event after beating second-seeded Oliver Marach and Mate Pavić in the Rolex Shanghai Masters semi-final. Kubot and Melo were eliminated from the ATP Finals despite winning their final match against top-seeds Oliver Marach and Mate Pavić. For the third time in his career Kubot ended the season in the top 10 ATP doubles ranking at No. 9.

2019: Kubot's 25th doubles title and 6th ATP doubles finals appearance

At the start of the season Kubot's partner Marcelo Melo was sidelined from Australian Open due to suffering a back injury. As a result, Kubot played doubles partnered with Horacio Zeballos. Kubot and Zeballos defeated Aljaž Bedene and Maximilian Marterer in the first round and Fabrice Martin and Jérémy Chardy in the second round. In his fifth career Australian Open doubles quarterfinal Kubot and his partner lost to Ryan Harrison and Sam Querrey in three sets.

At the 2019 BNP Paribas Open sixth seeds Łukasz Kubot and Marcelo Melo rallied past Wesley Koolhof and Stefanos Tsitsipas in first round and defeated Nick Kyrgios and Taylor Fritz to reach the quarterfinal. They battled past Dominic Inglot and Franko Škugor in one hour and 23 minutes and defeated Novak Djokovic and Fabio Fognini for a spot in the final. Runners-up in 2017, Kubot and Melo lost a tight finals match to Nikola Mektić and Horacio Zeballos.

Top seeds Łukasz Kubot and Marcelo Melo broke three times to return to the 2019 Miami Open semi-finals. The 2017 champions, swept fifth seeds Oliver Marach/Mate Pavić before falling to Bob Bryan/Mike Bryan in the last four.

In August top seeds Kubot/Melo won their first ATP Tour team title of 2019. The Polish-Brazilian pairing beat American wild cards Nicholas Monroe and Tennys Sandgren to claim the Winston-Salem Open championship, their 13th doubles crown together.

At the China Open Kubot and Melo recorded their sixth straight victory beating Mao-Xin Gong and Ze Zhang to reach the semi-finals. The defending champions claimed 82 per cent of first-serve points (27/33) and did not face a break point to advance after 68 minutes. Without dropping a set throughout the entire tournament the Polish-Brazilian duo defeated Karen Khachanov and Andrey Rublev for a place in the championship match. In the final they lost to Ivan Dodig and Filip Polášek.

At the 2019 Rolex Shanghai Masters Kubot and Melo rolled past Nicolas Mahut and Édouard Roger-Vasselin to reach their third consecutive final-round appearance in Shanghai. In the final they lost to Mate Pavić and Bruno Soares. Despite that loss they became the second team to qualify for the Nitto ATP Finals following their quarterfinal win at the Shanghai Masters.

In October top seeds Łukasz Kubot/Marcelo Melo defeated third seeds Pierre-Hugues Herbert/Nicolas Mahut to reach their second final at the 2019 Erste Bank Open in Vienna. In the championship match Kubot/Melo lost to the fourth seeds Rajeev Ram/Joe Salisbury. The 2015 Vienna champions had not dropped a set en route to their sixth ATP Tour doubles final of the season and had won 16 of their past 19 matches.

At the Nitto ATP Finals Łukasz Kubot and Marcelo Melo made a winning start to Group Jonas Björkman after beating Ivan Dodig and Filip Polášek. Kubot and Melo hit seven aces, won 76 percent of their first serve points in an hour and 40 minutes of play. They reached their second team semifinal at The O2 Arena after edging out Rajeev Ram and Joe Salisbury to finish Group Jonas Björkman with a 2–1 record.

2020: Kubot's 27th doubles title
In February second seeds Kubot and Melo saved two championship points to defeat top seeds Juan Sebastián Cabal and Robert Farah to win the Mexican Open (tennis) title in Acapulco. This was their 13th ATP Tour team doubles title and the first of this season. Kubot also enjoyed another milestone in Acapulco by picking up his 400th tour-level doubles victory. He accomplished the feat in the semi-final win against Nikola Ćaćić and Dušan Lajović.

In October top seeds Kubot and Melo beat third seeds Raven Klaasen and Oliver Marach to reach the 2020 Bett1Hulks Championship final in Cologne. In the final the Polish–Brazilian duo lost to second seeds Pierre-Hugues Herbert and Nicolas Mahut. Kubot and Melo continued at the Vienna Open where they defeated Jamie Murray and Neal Skupski to win the title. It is the third time that the veteran Polish-Brazilian duo has won the Erste Bank Open title as a team and it was their 15th tour-level title together.

In November, Kubot and Melo played at the 2020 Rolex Paris Masters where they lost to Félix Auger-Aliassime and Hubert Hurkacz in the semifinal. Next they participated in their fourth straight team appearance at the Nitto ATP Finals in London. The Polish-Brazilian duo qualified for the event by defeating Pierre-Hugues Herbert and Nicolas Mahut in the Paris quarter-finals.

Łukasz Kubot and Marcelo Melo finished their 2020 ATP Tour season and four-year partnership with a victory over Wesley Koolhof and Nikola Mektić in the Nitto ATP Finals.
They ended their fourth straight team appearance at The O2 with a 1-2 round-robin record. After the match, both Kubot and Melo were emotional. Melo confirmed it was their last match as a tandem on Instagram, writing: "Thanks Kubi! We had many good emotions during our partnership, today was not different. We end our team but we keep friends forever!" Kubot said. "We are very happy and pleased that this is here in London, because we have one of the best memories here from winning Wimbledon."

Kubot and Melo ended the season with a 21-13 team record. The Polish-Brazilian tandem claimed two ATP 500 titles in Acapulco and Vienna. They lifted 15 tour-level trophies during their partnership, including at 2017 Wimbledon and at four ATP Masters 1000 events.

2021: New doubles partner, reunion with Melo
At the end of 2020 season Łukasz Kubot and Marcelo Melo amicably split after a successful partnership that lasted more than four years. At the start of 2021 Kubot partnered with Wesley Koolhof to reach the third round at the 2021 Australian Open.

At Rotterdam Open third seeds Kubot and Koolhof defeated Ben McLachlan and Kei Nishikori before losing to Jérémy Chardy and Fabrice Martin in the second round. The pair reached the Masters 1000 quarterfinal at the 2021 Mutua Madrid Open where they were defeated by No. 2 seeds and eventual runners-up Pavić/Mektić.

In Roland Garros, Kubot and Melo decided to return to play together. They lost in the first round to Nicholas Monroe and Frances Tiafoe. But at the 2021 Wimbledon Championships they reached the quarterfinals.

Significant finals

Grand Slam finals

Doubles: 3 (2 titles, 1 runner-up)

Year-end championships

Doubles: 1 (1 runner-up)

Masters 1000 finals

Doubles: 9 (4 titles, 5 runners-up)

ATP career finals

Singles: 2 (2 runners-up)

Doubles: 48 (27 titles, 21 runners-up)

ATP Challenger and ITF Futures finals

Singles: 10 (6–4)

Doubles: 32 (20–12)

Performance timelines

Singles

* At the 2010 Australian Open, Kubot's third-round match was a walkover
|* At the 2013 Wimbledon Championships, Kubot's second-round match was a walkover

Doubles
Current after the 2022 French Open.

References

External links

 Official site 
 
 
 
 bio – file interview with Lukasz Kubot
 
 
 
 

1982 births
Polish male tennis players
Living people
People from Bolesławiec
Tennis players at the 2012 Summer Olympics
Tennis players at the 2016 Summer Olympics
Olympic tennis players of Poland
Sportspeople from Lower Silesian Voivodeship
Grand Slam (tennis) champions in men's doubles
Australian Open (tennis) champions
Wimbledon champions
Tennis players at the 2020 Summer Olympics
ATP number 1 ranked doubles tennis players
ITF World Champions